Dame Katherine Patricia Routledge,  (born 17 February 1929) is an English stage, TV and film actress and singer. 

Routledge is best known for her comedy role as Hyacinth Bucket in the BBC sitcom Keeping Up Appearances (1990–1995), she was nominated for the BAFTA TV Award for Best Light Entertainment Performance in 1992 and 1993. Her film appearances include To Sir, with Love (1967) and Don't Raise the Bridge, Lower the River (1968).

Routledge made her professional stage debut at the Liverpool Playhouse in 1952 and her Broadway debut in How's the World Treating You in 1966. She won the 1968 Tony Award for Best Actress in a Musical for her role in Darling of the Day, and the 1988 Olivier Award for Best Actress in a Musical for Candide.

On television, Routledge came to prominence during the 1980s in monologues written by Alan Bennett and Victoria Wood; appearing in Bennett's A Woman of No Importance (1982), as Kitty in Victoria Wood: As Seen on TV (1985–1986), and being nominated for the BAFTA TV Award for Best Actress for Bennett's Talking Heads: A Lady of Letters (1988). She also starred as Hetty Wainthropp in the British television series Hetty Wainthropp Investigates (1990, 1996–1998). In 2017, she was made a dame by Queen Elizabeth II for her services to entertainment and charity.

Early life
Routledge was born on 17 February 1929 in Tranmere in Cheshire. Her father was a haberdasher and gentlemen's outfitter. She was educated at Birkenhead High School, and the University of Liverpool. She gained a degree with honours in English Language and Literature. She was involved in the University's dramatic society, where she worked closely with the academic Edmund Colledge, who both directed and acted in several of the society's productions. It was Colledge who persuaded her to pursue an acting career. After graduating, she trained at the Bristol Old Vic Theatre School and returned to Liverpool to begin her acting career at the Liverpool Playhouse.

Career

Theatre
Routledge has had a long career in theatre, particularly musical theatre, in the United Kingdom and the United States. Her vocal range was labelled as a mezzo-soprano and a contralto. She has been a long-standing member of the Royal Shakespeare Company (RSC), appearing in such acclaimed productions as the 1984 Richard III, which starred Antony Sher in the title role. Her West End credits include Little Mary Sunshine, Cowardy Custard, Virtue in Danger, Noises Off, The Importance of Being Earnest, and The Solid Gold Cadillac, as well as a number of less successful vehicles. She was nominated for the Laurence Olivier Award for Best Actress in a Supporting Role for her work in And a Nightingale Sang in 1979. A classically trained singer, she has occasionally made forays into operetta including taking the title role in an acclaimed production of Jacques Offenbach's La Grande-Duchesse de Gérolstein at the 1978 Camden Festival; "As the Grand Duchess she invested every phrase, spoken or sung [...] with wit and meaning, and coloured her tone to express a wide variety of emotions. Never did she resort to the hoydenish behaviour that this role – in British productions at least – seems to invite."

Routledge made her Broadway debut in Roger Milner's comedy How's the World Treating You? in 1966, returning in the short-lived 1968 musical Darling of the Day, for which she won the Tony Award for Best Actress in a Musical, sharing the honour with Leslie Uggams of Hallelujah, Baby! Following this, Routledge had roles in several more unsuccessful Broadway productions including a musical called Love Match, in which she played Queen Victoria; the legendary 1976 Leonard Bernstein flop 1600 Pennsylvania Avenue, in which she portrayed every U.S. First Lady from Abigail Adams to Eleanor Roosevelt; and a 1981 musical, Say Hello to Harvey – based on the Mary Coyle Chase play Harvey (1944) – which closed in Toronto before reaching New York City.

In 1980, Routledge played Ruth in the Joseph Papp production of The Pirates of Penzance, co-starring American actor Kevin Kline and pop vocalist Linda Ronstadt, at the Delacorte Theatre in New York City's Central Park, one of a series of Shakespeare in the Park summer events. The show was a hit and transferred to Broadway the following January, with Estelle Parsons replacing Routledge. A DVD of the Central Park production, with Routledge, was released in October 2002. She also performed in Façade at New York's Carnegie Recital Hall.

Routledge won a Laurence Olivier Award in 1988 for her portrayal of the Old Lady in Leonard Bernstein's Candide in the London cast of the critically acclaimed Scottish Opera production. One critic noted "She stopped the show with 'I am so easily assimilated', and her long narration worked on at least two levels – it was both hilarious and oddly moving." She also played the role of Nettie Fowler to great acclaim in the 1993 London production of Carousel. In a 2006 Hampstead Theatre production of The Best of Friends, she portrayed Dame Laurentia McLachlan. In 2008, she played Queen Mary in Royce Ryton's play Crown Matrimonial. More recent work includes the narrator in The Carnival of the Animals with the Nash Ensemble in 2010, the role of Dame Myra Hess in the play Admission: One Shilling in 2011, and Lady Markby in An Ideal Husband at the Chichester Festival Theatre in 2014.

Since 2009, Routledge has toured with a show entitled Facing The Music. The show features insights into her musical theatre career.

Film and television
Routledge's screen credits include To Sir, with Love (1967), Pretty Polly (1967), 30 Is a Dangerous Age, Cynthia, The Bliss of Mrs. Blossom, Don't Raise the Bridge, Lower the River (all 1968), If It's Tuesday, This Must Be Belgium (1969) and Girl Stroke Boy (1971).

Routledge's early television appearances included a role in Steptoe and Son, in the episode "Seance in a Wet Rag and Bone Yard" (1974), as a clairvoyant called Madame Fontana. She also appeared in Coronation Street (1961), and as a white witch in Doctor at Large (1971). Routledge played Mrs. Jennings in the BBC mini-series production of Sense and Sensibility (1971). However, she did not come to prominence on television until she featured in monologues written for her by Alan Bennett and later Victoria Wood in the 1980s. She first appeared in A Woman of No Importance, the second installment of Bennett's anthology, Objects of Affection in 1982. She then played the opinionated Kitty in Victoria Wood: As Seen on TV in 1985. She performed two further monologues in Bennett's Talking Heads in 1988 and 1998. Routledge was nominated for a British Academy Television Award for Best Actress for the monologue "A Lady of Letters".

In 1989, Routledge accepted the lead role of Hetty Wainthropp in an ITV mystery drama, Hetty Wainthropp: Missing Persons. ITV opted not to pursue a series after the pilot episode, but in 1996 the BBC produced the first series of Hetty Wainthropp Investigates, with Routledge again in the lead role. The show co-starred Dominic Monaghan as her assistant and Derek Benfield as her husband. It was first aired in January 1996, and ran until the autumn of 1998, with a special episode in 1999. Monaghan, who went on to enjoy a Hollywood career, has since credited Routledge as "an amazing teacher" who taught him some "very valuable lessons" in acting.

In 1990, Routledge was cast as Hyacinth Bucket in the comedy series Keeping Up Appearances. She portrayed a formerly working-class woman with social pretensions (insisting her surname be pronounced "bouquet") and delusions of grandeur (her oft-mentioned "candlelight suppers"). Routledge delighted in portraying Hyacinth, as she claimed she "couldn't stand people like her" in real life. In 1991, she won a British Comedy Award for her portrayal, and she was later nominated for two BAFTA TV Awards in 1992 and 1993. Routledge left the role in 1995, despite the series' ongoing popularity, as she wished to pursue other roles as an actress. During an interview on Australian television, Routledge said: "I'd much rather people look back and say 'I remember that' than say 'Oh, is that still on?'" Another reason she wished to leave the role was that she felt that the writer Roy Clarke, was "rewriting old scripts".

Routledge has also played several real-life characters for television, including Barbara Pym and in a dramatised BBC Omnibus biographical documentary of 1994, Hildegard of Bingen.

In 2001, Routledge starred in Anybody's Nightmare, a fact-based television drama in which she played Sheila Bowler, a mother and piano teacher who served four years in prison for murdering her elderly aunt, but was later acquitted following a retrial.

Radio and audio books
In 1966, Routledge sang the role of Mad Margaret in Ruddigore, the title role in Iolanthe, and Melissa in Princess Ida, in a series of BBC Radio Gilbert and Sullivan recordings. She took part in a studio broadcast of Tchaikovsky's opera Vakula the Smith (narrating excerpts from the work by Gogol) in 1989. In 2006, she was featured in an episode of the Stage and Screen series on Radio 3.

Routledge's extensive radio credits include several Alan Bennett plays and the BBC dramatisation of Carole Hayman's Ladies of Letters, in which she and Prunella Scales play retired women exchanging humorous correspondence over the course of several years. A tenth series of Ladies of Letters premiered on BBC Radio 4 in 2009.

Radio work prior to 1985 included Private Lives, Present Laughter, The Cherry Orchard, Romeo and Juliet, Alice in Wonderland and The Fountain Overflows.

Having a distinctive voice, Routledge has also recorded and released a variety of audiobooks including unabridged readings of Wuthering Heights and Alice's Adventures in Wonderland and abridged novelisations of the Hetty Wainthropp series.

Personal life
Routledge has never married and has no children. In a 2001 interview, she said: "I didn't make a decision not to be married and not to be a mother. Life just turned out like that because my involvement in acting was so total". In the same interview, Routledge discussed two affairs she had been involved in: one with a married man whilst in her late 20s and the other being some years later with a man directing a play she was appearing in.

She has lived in Chichester since 2000 and regularly worships at Chichester Cathedral. In 2020, she helped raise £10,000 towards the restoration of the cathedral roof.

Routledge is a patron of the Beatrix Potter Society and an ambassador for the charity Royal Voluntary Service, previously known as WRVS.

Honours
Routledge was appointed Officer of the Order of the British Empire (OBE) in the 1993 Birthday Honours, Commander of the Order of the British Empire (CBE) in the 2004 Birthday Honours, and Dame Commander of the Order of the British Empire (DBE) in the 2017 New Year Honours for services to theatre and charity.

In 2008, Routledge received an honorary degree of Doctor of Letters from Lancaster University for her contribution to drama and theatre.

On 15 March 2019, Routledge received an honorary degree of Doctor of Letters from the University of Chester at Chester Cathedral for her contributions to theatre and television.

In 2022, the Royal Academy of Music conferred Routledge with honorary membership.

An honorary president of the Association of English Singers & Speakers (which exists to "encourage communication of English words in speech and song with clarity, understanding and imagination"), she has sponsored the annual AESS National English Song Prize from 2003 to the present.

Screen and stage work

Film

Television

Stage

Discography

Cast recordings

Studio albums

Awards and nominations

References

External links
 StackPath 
 selected performances in Theatre Archive University of Bristol
 Interview January, 2015, in the Coeur d' Alene Press 
 
 
 Patricia Routledge at the British Film Institute
 Patricia Routledge (Aveleyman)

1929 births
20th-century English actresses
20th-century English singers
20th-century English women singers
21st-century English actresses
21st-century English singers
21st-century English women singers
Actresses awarded damehoods
Actresses from Merseyside
Alumni of Bristol Old Vic Theatre School
Alumni of the University of Liverpool
Audiobook narrators
Dames Commander of the Order of the British Empire
English Anglicans
English film actresses
English musical theatre actresses
English radio actresses
English stage actresses
English television actresses
English voice actresses
Laurence Olivier Award winners
Living people
People educated at Birkenhead High School Academy
People from Birkenhead
Royal Shakespeare Company members
Tony Award winners